Oxshott railway station serves the village of Oxshott, in Surrey, England. The station, and all trains serving it, are operated by South Western Railway.

The station is on the New Guildford Line, and is served by trains from Waterloo to Guildford via Cobham.

History
The station opened on 2 February 1885 as Oxshott and Fairmile. At that time the village was, as Fairmile remains, just a hamlet without place of worship. The brickfields here were served by a short siding from the station. These supplied bricks for many London buildings in the late 19th and early 20th centuries.

Incidents 

On 5 November 2010, at about 3:30 pm, a concrete mixer lorry fell off the bridge over the railway 50 metres north-east of the station, and landed on carriages of a train accelerating away from the station. No-one was killed. Witnesses stated that the rear of the lorry crashed through the parapet of the bridge and dragged the whole vehicle over the side of the bridge. The eight-carriage train, operated by South West Trains, was working the 15:05 Guildford to London Waterloo. The train was formed of two Class 455 electric multiple units. The lorry, loaded with concrete and weighing 24 tonnes, landed on the sixth carriage, severely crushing the end of the roof. Further damage was sustained by the fifth, seventh and eighth carriages, with the last of these being derailed at its trailing bogie, although the train remained upright. British Transport Police reported that six people on board the train sustained minor injuries, whilst the driver of the lorry had sustained more serious injuries. This was later revised to two serious and five minor injuries. The Class 455 electric multiple unit involved has since been fully repaired using a rebuilt carriage from a Class 210 diesel multiple unit and returned to service in July 2013.

Services
All services at Oxshott are operated by South Western Railway using  EMUs.

The typical off-peak service in trains per hour is:
 2 tph to  via 
 2 tph to 

On Sundays, the service is reduced to hourly in each direction.

References

External links

Railway stations in Surrey
Former London and South Western Railway stations
Railway stations in Great Britain opened in 1885
Railway stations served by South Western Railway
Borough of Elmbridge